Faeculoides bifusa is a moth of the family Erebidae first described by Michael Fibiger in 2008. It is known from the mountains of central Sri Lanka.

Adults have been found from March to July, suggesting several generations per year.

The wingspan is 11.5–13 mm. The forewing is long and broad and the reniform stigma is weakly marked. The basal and postmedial areas are brown and the medial and subterminal area (including fringes) are blackish. The crosslines are weakly marked and the terminal line is indicated by black interveinal spots. The hindwing has an indistinct discal spot.

References

Micronoctuini
Moths described in 2008